Douds may refer to:

People
Dennis Douds (born 1941), American football coach
Forrest Douds (1905–1979), American football player
Robert Douds (born 1989), GatesheadFC football player

Places
Douds, Iowa

See also
Doud, a surname